Acci is an ancient city in Spain.

Acci may also refer to:
Diocese of Acci, a bishopric founded in Acci
ACCI, acronym for Australian Chamber of Commerce and Industry